Bowling at the 2010 Asian Games was held in Tianhe Bowling Hall, Guangzhou, China from November 15 to 24, 2010.

Schedule

Medalists

Men

Women

Medal table

Participating nations
A total of 178 athletes from 17 nations competed in bowling at the 2010 Asian Games:

References

 www.abf-online.org
 Bowling Digital

External links
Bowling Site of 2010 Asian Games

 
2010 Asian Games events
2010
Asian Games
2010 Asian Games